Mark Anthony Gillespie (born 26 August 1969) is an Irish cricketer born at Derry. A left-handed batsman and leg spin bowler, he played four times for the Ireland cricket team between 2000 and 2001.

Career 
In 2000, he played his only first-class match, against Scotland in August. The following year, he represented Ireland in the Triple Crown Tournament.

He has not played for Ireland since, though he continues to be active in Irish club cricket, playing for Strabane. His brother Peter also represents Ireland at cricket and was named in the Ireland squad for the 2007 World Cup.

References

1969 births
Living people
Cricketers from Northern Ireland
Sportspeople from Derry (city)